Kapadia is a surname common in India and Pakistan. The name literally translates into "fabric maker". Traditionally, it included people involved in the textiles industry. Notable people with the surname Kapadia include:

India 
 Dimple Kapadia (born 1957), actress
 Harish Kapadia (born 1945), mountaineer
 Nawang Kapadia (1975–2000), Indian Army officer and Harish's son
 Simple Kapadia (1958–2009), actress
 Sarosh Homi Kapadia, Former Chief Justice of India
 Novy Kapadia, Indian Football Commentator and Author

Pakistan 
 Latif Kapadia (1934–2002)
 Muzammil Hussain Kapadia (1961–2021) 
 Faisal Kapadia (born 1971)
 Anwar Kapadia (born 1965)

United Kingdom 
 Asif Kapadia (born 1972), filmmaker